Hazen High School is a public high school located in Hazen, North Dakota. It currently serves 169 students and is a part of the Hazen Public Schools system. The official school colors are green and white and the athletic teams are known as The Bison.

Athletics

Championships

State class "B" girls' basketball: 1994 1995 1996 1997 1998 1999 2000 2001 2002
State class "B" football: 1996
State class "A" football: 2012, 2013,2014,2015,2016
State Class 'B' boys' track and field: 1972 co-champions, 2007, 2008
State Class 'B' girls' track and field: 1993, 1994, 1995, 1996, 1997, 1998, 2015, 2016, 2017
State Class 'B' volleyball: 1993 1995 1997 1998 2004 2005
State Class 'B' girls' golf: 2008, 2009
State Class 'B' boys' golf: 2008, 2009

References

External links

Public high schools in North Dakota
North Dakota High School Activities Association (Class B)
North Dakota High School Activities Association (Class AA Football)
Schools in Mercer County, North Dakota
National Register of Historic Places in Mercer County, North Dakota